The 1983 WAFU Club Championship was the seventh football club tournament season that took place for the runners-up of each West African country's domestic league, the West African Club Championship. It was won by New Nigerian Bank in the first of two finals matches against Ghana's Sekondi Hasaacas FC. It featured 12 clubs and 22 matches, four shorter than last season.  As the military team ASFA Nouakchott forfeited and Ghana's Great Olympics headed to the quarterfinals, the match totals shortened to 20. A total of 38 goals were scored fewer than last season.

Not a single club from the Gambia, Liberia and Niger participated in the edition.

Preliminary round

|}

Intermediary Round

|}

Semifinals

|}

Finals

|}

Winners

See also
1983 African Cup of Champions Clubs
1983 CAF Cup Winners' Cup

References

External links
Full results of the 1983 WAFU Cup at RSSSF

West African Club Championship
1983 in African football